Shohada Basij Ray Futsal Club ( was an Iranian futsal club based in Rey, Iran. The team played in the Iranian Futsal Super League a professional futsal league competition for clubs located at the highest level of the Iranian futsal league system.

Source : FootBall-Tehran

References

External links 

Defunct futsal clubs in Iran
Futsal clubs in Iran
Futsal clubs established in 1997